Wilhelm Reisinger (born 30 June 1958) is a German former professional footballer who played as a forward. He spent four seasons in the Bundesliga with Bayern Munich.

Honours 
 Bundesliga: 1979–80

References

External links 
 

1958 births
Living people
People from Cham (district)
Sportspeople from the Upper Palatinate
German footballers
Footballers from Bavaria
Association football forwards
Bundesliga players
2. Bundesliga players
FC Bayern Munich footballers
FC Bayern Munich II players
Stuttgarter Kickers players
K.V. Mechelen players
Tennis Borussia Berlin players
SW Bregenz players
1. FC Schweinfurt 05 players
Kapfenberger SV players
German expatriate footballers
German expatriate sportspeople in Belgium
Expatriate footballers in Belgium
German expatriate sportspeople in Austria
Expatriate footballers in Austria